The 2010–11 Kentucky Wildcats men's basketball team represented the University of Kentucky in the college basketball season of 2010–11. The team's head coach is John Calipari, who entered his second season after posting a 35–3 record in his inaugural season.

Pre-season

Departures

Recruiting

Class of 2010 signees

Class of 2011 commitments

Roster

Twany Beckham transferred from Mississippi State in January 2011.  He was not eligible to play until December 2011.  He was still able to practice and be a part of the roster, but was not on scholarship during spring 2011.

Depth chart

2010-2011 Schedule Notes

|-
!colspan=12 style=| Exhibition

|-
!colspan=12 style=| Non-conference regular season

|-
!colspan=12 style=| SEC regular season

 
|-
!colspan=12 style=| SEC Tournament

|-

|-

|-
!colspan=12 style=| NCAA tournament

Rankings

References

Kentucky Wildcats men's basketball seasons
Kentucky
Kentucky
NCAA Division I men's basketball tournament Final Four seasons
Kentucky Wildcats
Kentucky Wildcats